Thompsontown and Thompson Town may refer to:
Thompsontown, Pennsylvania
Thompson Town, West Virginia